The Oracle: Magazine of Fantasy Gaming was a magazine published by Horizon International, Inc. It was an amateur/semi-professional magazine covering fantasy role-playing games. The magazine published one year, between 1982 and 1983.

History and profile
The first issue appeared in July 1982. The founder was a teenager and the magazine was based in Salt Lake, Utah. It ceased publication in 1983.

Reception
Ian L. Straus reviewed The Oracle in The Space Gamer No. 63. Straus commented that "It had impressive graphics and artwork and competent editing, which made it superior to most amateur 'zines. Much of the artwork consisted of excellent reproduction of photographs. Some of the content was done by well-known professionals in the hobby [...] To sum it up: bad management and no marketing judgement."

References

1982 establishments in Utah
1983 disestablishments in Utah
Defunct magazines published in the United States
Magazines established in 1982
Magazines disestablished in 1983
Magazines published in Utah
Mass media in Salt Lake City
Role-playing game magazines